Edwin Ashby (2 November 1861 – 8 January 1941) was an Adelaide based Australian property developer and a noted malacologist interested in chitons and ornithologist.  He was a founding member of the South Australian Ornithological Association (SAOA) in 1899, and of the Royal Australasian Ornithologists Union (RAOU) in 1901 for which he served as president 1926.  The avian genus Ashbyia (represented by the gibberbird Ashbyia lovensis) was named for him by Gregory Mathews.

Ashby owned a farm, which he called 'Wittunga', in the Adelaide Hills. In 1901, he began a formal English garden beside the main house, which was later developed botanically by his son, Arthur Keith Ashby; his son donated to garden to the State of South Australia in 1965, and it was opened to the public in 1975 as Wittunga Botanic Garden.

In 1911, Ashby expanded the Wittunga farming operation when he acquired a nearby parcel, his 'Watiparinga' land. In the late 1950s, daughter Alison Marjorie Ashby began planting thousands of seedlings of Australian plants in Watiparinga. She eventually donated Watiparinga to the National Trust of South Australia in 1957, which now operates it as the Watiparinga Reserve; the reserve was added to the Register of the National Estate in 1996.

References 

Botanists with author abbreviations
Australian malacologists
Australian ornithologists
1861 births
1941 deaths